Halton may refer to:

Places

United Kingdom 
 Borough of Halton, Cheshire
Halton (UK Parliament constituency)
Halton, Runcorn
 Halton, Buckinghamshire
 RAF Halton
 Halton, Lancashire
 Halton, Leeds
 Halton, Northumberland
 Halton East, North Yorkshire
 Halton Gill, North Yorkshire
 Halton Holegate, Lincolnshire
 Halton Lea Gate, Northumberland
 Halton West, North Yorkshire

Canada 
 Halton (electoral district)
 Halton (provincial electoral district)
 Halton County, Ontario
 Halton Regional Municipality, Ontario

Other uses 
 Halton (barony)
 Halton (surname)
 Halton Arp (1927–2013), American astronomer
 Halton sequence, a sequence of nearly uniformly distributed numbers that appear to be random
 Handley Page Halton, civil version of the Halifax bomber aircraft

See also

 Halton Castle (disambiguation)
 Halton railway station (disambiguation)
 
 Hal (disambiguation)
 Hall (disambiguation)
 Halle (disambiguation)
 Halltown (disambiguation)